William J. Reinhart (August 2, 1896 – February 14, 1971) was an American college basketball, football, and baseball coach at the George Washington University, the University of Oregon, and the United States Merchant Marine Academy. From 1923 to 1935, he served as the head basketball coach at Oregon. He is the school's second-winningest coach with 180 victories. His record through 13 seasons at Oregon was 180–101. He suffered only one losing season. Largely due to his success, Oregon was forced to build McArthur Court to accommodate the large crowds that became fixtures for Ducks games on his watch.

At George Washington, he compiled a 319–237 record in basketball, or .574 winning percentage, including a 23–3 season in 1953–54. His teams twice made the NCAA tournament, in 1954 and 1961, George Washington's only trips to the NCAA Tournament until Mike Jarvis's team in 1993.  Players he coached at George Washington included future Basketball Hall of Famer Red Auerbach and future National Basketball Association (NBA) players Joe Holup, Corky Devlin and Gene Guarilia and at Oregon he coached Howard Hobson. Auerbach said Reinhart's coaching and fast break offenses were "15 years ahead of their time."

Reinhart also was head football coach at George Washington and the United States Merchant Marine Academy, assistant football coach at Oregon, and head baseball coach at Oregon and George Washington.

Reinhart died of cancer on February 14, 1971, at Georgetown University Hospital in Washington, D.C.  He was inducted into  George Washington's athletic hall of fame in 1993.

A collection of papers and memorabilia related to Reinhart is housed in the Special Collections Research Center of The George Washington University.  The collection includes correspondence, photographs, certificates, and news clippings.  The material ranges in date from 1920 to 1993.

Head coaching record

Football

Basketball

References

External links
 

1896 births
1971 deaths
American football quarterbacks
American men's basketball players
Baseball players from Oregon
Basketball coaches from Oregon
Basketball players from Oregon
Deaths from cancer in Washington, D.C.
George Washington Colonials athletic directors
George Washington Colonials baseball coaches
George Washington Colonials football coaches
George Washington Colonials men's basketball coaches
Merchant Marine Mariners athletic directors
Merchant Marine Mariners football coaches
Oregon Ducks baseball coaches
Oregon Ducks football coaches
Oregon Ducks football players
Oregon Ducks men's basketball coaches
Oregon Ducks men's basketball players
Players of American football from Oregon
Sportspeople from Salem, Oregon